Cunning Stunts is the fifth studio album by the Minneapolis-based noise rock band Cows, released in 1992 by Amphetamine Reptile Records. It was their first album where they began developing real melodies and patterns instead of their usual blasts of noise. The switch to producer Iain Burgess brought an increase in sound quality from previous albums. It was long since out print; however, MVD Audio reissued and distributed the album on CD and a limited edition "Blue Opaque" vinyl LP in 2016.

The title is a spoonerism of the term "stunning cunts".  The band Caravan used this title for their 1975 album. The album cover design alludes to the Reid Miles designed cover of Eric Dolphy's 1964 album Out to Lunch!

The band supported the album with a North American tour.

Critical reception

The Chicago Sun-Times wrote that "the music is jarring and [Shannon] Selberg's howling is initially user-unfriendly, yet his disturbed lyrics are undeniable." The Lancaster New Era listed Cunning Stunts as one of 1992's best albums, deeming it "truly, truly demented and truly, truly beautiful." In 1999, City Pages included it on a list of Amphetamine Reptile's greatest albums; it was also given an honorable mention in an article about the best Minneapolis albums of the 1990s.

Track listing

Personnel 
Adapted from the Cunning Stunts liner notes.

Cows
 Thor Eisentrager – guitar
 Norm Rogers – drums
 Kevin Rutmanis – bass guitar
 Shannon Selberg – vocals, bugle

Production and additional personnel
 Iain Burgess – production, recording
 Günter Pauler – mastering

Release history

References

External links 
 

Cows (band) albums
1992 albums
Amphetamine Reptile Records albums
Albums produced by Iain Burgess